Cunning Stunts is a live album by heavy metal band Metallica. It was released in 1998 on DVD and VHS formats.

The DVD features concert footage, band interviews, a documentary, behind the scenes footage, and a photo gallery consisting of approximately 1,000 photos taken by Anton Corbijn. Some of which were used in the album sleeves for Reload. Three of the performances feature multiple angles.

During the performance of the song "Enter Sandman", the entire stage is set to appear to collapse and explode, with pyrotechnics and a technician (referred to in the extras as the "Burning Dude") who runs across the stage while on fire, as another technician swings overhead.

This is also one of the few Metallica concerts that did not feature "The Ecstasy of Gold" as an intro.

The title is a spoonerism of the words stunning cunts.  The band Caravan had already used this title for their 1975 album. The Cows used this title for their 1992 release.

Track listing

Disc 1

Disc 2

Personnel 
Metallica
 James Hetfield – vocals, rhythm guitar
 Lars Ulrich – drums
 Kirk Hammett – lead guitar, backing vocals
 Jason Newsted – bass, backing vocals

Production
Andie Airfix – artwork, design
Anton Corbijn – photography
Wayne Isham – director

Metallica video albums
A Band Apart films
1998 video albums
1998 live albums
Live video albums
Metallica live albums